Paul Thomas Barton (born 9 October 1935) is a former New Zealand cricketer who played in seven Tests from 1961 to 1963.

Domestic career
A batsman who usually came in at number three or four, Barton played his provincial cricket for Wellington from 1954–55 to 1967–68. His highest score was 118 against Auckland in 1960–61.

International career
He made Test debut on tour against South Africa in Durban with a fine half century. His other Test innings of note came in the final game of the same series, when he made 109 in Port Elizabeth, a "composed, correct and polished" innings of four and a half hours that was the only century in a match that New Zealand won by 40 runs to square the series. This promising first series, 240 runs at 30.00, cemented his place in the Test team against England in 1962-63 but he made only 45 runs in the three Tests and was not selected again.

References

External links

 Interview with Paul Barton about his cricket career

1935 births
Living people
New Zealand Test cricketers
New Zealand cricketers
Wellington cricketers